Tube-and-fabric construction is a method of building airframes, which include the fuselages and wings of airplanes. It consists of making a framework of metal tubes (generally welded together) and then covering the framework with an aircraft fabric covering.

The tubes are usually of steel or aluminum.

The advantages of tube-and-fabric construction over other methods of airframe construction (such as wood and sheet metal) are lower cost and faster speed of construction.

See also 
Space frame

References 

Aircraft components
Structural system